Pantelleria Airport  is a regional airport on the Italian island of Pantelleria. It is located 5 km from the town centre and features both regular and charter flights from and to Sicily and mainland Italy. It was a military airport until 2016 when it became a state owned civilian airport, although an Air Force detachment remained operational.

Airlines and destinations

The following airlines operate from/to the airport:

Statistics

In the media
The airport's terminal interior and apron can be seen in the 2016 movie A Bigger Splash starring Tilda Swinton.

References

External links
Official website

Airports in Sicily
Airfields of the United States Army Air Forces in Italy
Airports established in 1938
1938 establishments in Italy
Pier Luigi Nervi buildings